Satwas is a town and a Nagar Panchayat in Dewas district in the Indian state of Madhya Pradesh.

Geography 
Satwas is a Tehsil in Dewas District of Madhya Pradesh State, India. Satwas Tehsil headquarters is Satwas town.

Satwas Tehsil is bordered by Khategaon Tehsil towards East, Kannod Tehsil towards North, Bagli Tehsil towards West and Baladi Tehsil towards South. Harda City, Sehore City, Dewas City, Barwaha City and Seoni-Malwa City are the cities nearby.	

Satwas Tehsil consists of 150 Villages and 40 Panchayats.

Nearby important tourism destinations are Jayantimata Temple (Barwaha) , Indira Sagar Dam , Omkareshwar (Omkareshwar Jyothirlinga) , SalkanPur Mata Temple , Nemawar , Bhimbetka (Bhim Baithaka), Indore, Bhopal and Itarsi.

Demographics

Population 
The Satwas Nagar Panchayat has a population of 14,108 of which 7,243 are males while 6,865 are females as per report released by Census India 2011.

Population of Children with age of 0-6 is 2274 which is 16.12% of total population of Satwas (NP). In Satwas Nagar Panchayat, female sex ratio is of 948 against state average of 931. Moreover, child sex ratio in Satwas is around 974 compared to Madhya Pradesh state average of 918. 

Literacy rate of Satwas city is 67.81%, lower than state average of 69.32%. In Satwas, male literacy is around 78.77% while female literacy rate is 56.19%.

Schedule Tribe (ST) constitutes 9.15% while Schedule Caste (SC) were 7.53% of total population in Satwas (NP).

Out of total population, 5,191 were engaged in work or business activity. Of this 3,700 were males while 1,491 were females. In census survey, worker is defined as person who does business, job, service, and cultivator and labour activity. Of total 5191 working population, 84.80% were engaged in Main Work while 15.20% of total workers were engaged in marginal work.

Religion 
Data of 2011:

Government and politics 
Satwas Nagar Panchayat has total administration over 2,798 houses to which it supplies basic amenities like water and sewerage. It is also authorized to build roads within Nagar Panchayat limits and impose taxes on properties coming under its jurisdiction.

The Satwas city is divided into 15 wards for which elections are held every 5 years.

Transport
The nearest railway station is Harda. The major railway station Indore Jn Bg is around  far.

Banks

 Bank Of India (Ifsc Code : BKID0008921, micrCode: 455013509)
 State Bank Of India (SBIN0017653)

References

Cities and towns in Dewas district